Dragonworld: The Legend Continues (also known as: Dragonworld II and originally released on VHS in North America as: Shadow of the Knight) is a 1999 Adventure fantasy film. It is a Direct-to-video sequel to the original 1994 film, Dragonworld. The film was actually originally filmed in 1996, but did not see a release until 1999. Andrew Keir is the only cast member to reprise his role as Angus McGowan from the original film, and it's the last film that he has acted in, during the 1996 production, before his death in 1997; this film is dedicated to him in memory.

Plot
The film bears little relation to the first movie. Johnny McGowan and his only true friend, Yowler, the last dragon on Earth, are in serious trouble. The Dark Knight, the enemy of Dragonkin, has returned and is determined to slay Yowler, in order to obtain the magical powers inside the dragon's blood to bring a new evil age of darkness upon the planet. Young John begins a new quest to protect Yowler, defeat the Dark Knight and save the world for all future generations.

Cast
Drake Bell as Johnny McGowan
Richard Trask as Yowler the Dragon
Andrew Keir as Angus McGowan
James Ellis as McCoy
Tina Martin as Mrs. Cosgrove
Judith Paris as Mrs. Churchill
Constantin Barbulescu as MacClain
Avram Besoiu as Kimison
Julius Liptac as Kimison #1 (credited as Iulius Liptac)
Cezar Boghina as Kimison #2
Mihai Verbintschi as Kimison #3 (credited as Mihai Verbitchi)
Gheorghe Flonda as Mob 1
Dan Glasu as Mob 2
Ovidiu Mot as Mob 3

Development
The film was produced in 1996 and the film locations were centered at Castel Film Studios of Bucharest, Romania.

Reception
The film has mainly received negative reviews, upon critics, compared to the original film. Rotten Tomatoes currently holds a 36% score of this film. The film has been panned for its poor directing, poor storyline, poor acting and poor designed special effects, especially with Yowler, who was played by Richard Trask in a Dragon suit, giving the film a poor design reaction towards Critics.

References

External links

1999 films
Films about dragons
English-language Scottish films
English-language Romanian films
American fantasy films
Scottish films
British fantasy films
Romanian fantasy films
Direct-to-video fantasy films
Paramount Pictures direct-to-video films
Direct-to-video sequel films
1990s English-language films
Films directed by Ted Nicolaou
1990s American films
1990s British films